Robert F. Kennedy's remarks at the University of Kansas were given on March 18, 1968. He spoke about student protests, the Vietnam War, and the gross national product. At the time, Kennedy's words on the latter subject went relatively unnoticed, but they have since become famous.

Background
Kennedy had given his first campaign speech earlier that morning at Kansas State University before flying into Lawrence Municipal Airport to give his speech at the University of Kansas. Classes were cancelled in advance of Kennedy's appearance.

The speech
The speech was delivered at 1:30 PM in Phog Allen Fieldhouse before 20,000 people. The arena itself was over capacity; the school had only 16,000 enrolled students, and many sat on the basketball court, leaving only a minimal amount of open space around the lectern in the center.

Shortly before the speech, Kennedy warned the student union, "Some of you may not like what you're going to hear in a few minutes, but it's what I believe; and if I'm elected president, it's what I'm going to do..."

Summary

Most of Kennedy's speech was given extemporaneously, with phrases from older speeches linking together sections from his remarks at KSU. He began on the subject of the Vietnam War, calling for an end to the bombing campaign and negotiations with the Viet Cong.

On the matter of student protests, he quoted William Allen White (a university alum), as he had in his earlier speech: 

These words surprised many members of the audience.

He continued onto the matter of poverty, expressing his  own feeling of horror at the conditions poor Americans faced:

He continued, borrowing imagery from Michael Harrington's book, The Other America:

Kennedy notably outlined why he thought the gross national product was an insufficient measure of success. He emphasized the negative values it accounted for and the positive ones it ignored:

Towards the end of his speech, he quoted George Bernard Shaw:

These words would become a centerpiece of Kennedy's presidential campaign, and he would repeat them on several occasions.

Kennedy was interrupted 38 times during his speech for applause.

Aftermath
It took Kennedy 15 minutes to make it out of the arena to his car. He later departed on a flight for Washington, D.C. Campaign staffer Jim Tolan would later say of the students' reception, "It was the first time I was ever scared with [Kennedy]. Those kids were out of control. He could have gotten hurt they liked him so much."

Legacy
At the time, Kennedy's criticism of the gross national product didn't receive much attention, though it has since become famous, receiving significant coverage in the writings of economic critics. His words are credited as the beginning of the Beyond GDP movement. In an interview in 2008, Barack Obama said that Kennedy's University of Kansas oration was "one of the most beautiful of his speeches."

Notes

References

Speeches by Robert F. Kennedy
1968 in American politics
University of Kansas
1968 speeches